Susan Josephine Neuhaus  (née Evans) is an Australian general surgeon and surgical oncologist with specialty interests in melanoma and sarcoma surgery. Neuhaus was one of three finalists for the South Australian nomination for Australian of the Year in 2012.

Education
Neuhaus graduated with MB, BS in 1989 from the University of Adelaide. She completed her PhD in 2000 also at the University of Adelaide, in the mechanisms of the spread of cancer.

Career

Military
Neuhaus served in both the Australian Army and  Australian Army Reserve. Her operational experience included postings to Cambodia, Bougainville and Afghanistan She was the first female doctor to be posted overseas from Australia as regimental medical officer in 1993 when she spent 9 months with the United Nations Transitional Authority in Cambodia followed four years later by several months with the Peace Monitoring Group in Bougainville as an officer in the Army Reserve. She later served as Clinical Director of the multinational NATO hospital in Uruzgan Province, Afghanistan in 2009. She retired from the Army in 2010 with the rank of colonel.

After retirement from military service
Since retiring from military service in 2010, Dr Neuhaus has researched and written extensively on women in the Australian Defence Force, from the experiences of mothers on deployment, to the female military surgeons of World War I and the health needs of servicewomen and female veterans. 
As Associate Professor Conflict Medicine, Susan leads a developing national research collaborative approach investigating the gender specific effects of military service and deployment. This included the landmark study: Mothers in the Middle East Area of Operations (MEAO) -The health impacts of maternal deployment.
In 2018, Colonel Neuhaus (Ret) became the first woman to deliver the ANZAC Day Australian War Memorial dawn service address.

Medical career
She was admitted as a Fellow of the Royal Australasian College of Surgeons in 2003. She received the Lumley Surgical Scholarship in 2004 and worked in the Melanoma and Sarcoma Unit at Royal Marsden Hospital in London.

In 2016, Neuhaus is a staff specialist in Surgical Oncology at the Royal Adelaide Hospital and Clinical Associate Professor in the Department of Surgery at the University of Adelaide. Her publications include work on medical ethics and surgery in war zones, as well as the spread and treatment of cancer.

Awards and honours
 Conspicuous Service Cross in the 2009 Queen's Birthday Honours for "outstanding achievement in the provision of medical support as the Commanding Officer of the 3rd Health Support Battalion."
 Finalist for the South Australian nomination for Australian of the Year in 2012.

References

Bibliography

External links
 

Living people
Year of birth missing (living people)
Fellows of the Royal Australasian College of Surgeons
Members of the Order of Australia
Recipients of the Conspicuous Service Cross (Australia)
People from Adelaide
Australian military doctors
Australian oncologists
Women oncologists
Australian women medical doctors
Australian medical doctors